"Flies" is a song by experimental hip hop group Death Grips. It was released as a single from their sixth studio album Year of the Snitch, on May 22, 2018, through Third Worlds, an imprint of Harvest Records.

Release
On May 22, 2018, Death Grips shared "Flies" on social media. The song was released with an accompanying music video. "Flies" contains samples of three previously released songs by the band: "I've Seen Footage" and "System Blower" from The Money Store and "Spread Eagle Cross the Block" from Exmilitary.

Reception
"Flies" received generally positive reviews from critics upon its release. Writing for Consequence of Sound, Randall Colburn described the song as "[evoking] a swarm of winged creatures, its spastic beat underscoring whirring synths, colorful drones, and MC Ride’s trademark bark." Jake Boyer of Highsnobiety commended "Flies" for "offering [Death Grips'] usual potent blend of visceral hardcore electro with a heart of utter darkness".

References

2018 singles
2018 songs
Harvest Records singles